The Calul or Calu is a right tributary of the river Bistrița in Romania. It discharges into the Bistrița in Piatra Șoimului, near Roznov.

References

Rivers of Romania
Rivers of Neamț County